The 2002 Indonesia Open in badminton was held in Surabaya, from August 26 to September 1, 2002. It was a five-star tournament and the prize money was US$170,000.

Venue
GOR Kertajaya Indah

Final results

Men's singles

Women's singles

References 

Badminton World Federation

External links
Tournamentsoftware.com
Tangkis.tripod.com

Indonesia Open (badminton)
Indonesia
Sport in Surabaya
2002 in Indonesian sport